The Karen Baptist Theological Seminary is a Baptist theological institute in Seminary Hill, Insein, Yangon, Myanmar. It is affiliated with the Karen Baptist Convention.

History 
The school was founded in 1845 by the American Baptist Missionary Union. The seminary's academic courses are taught primarily in the S'gaw Karen language, with English being used for other purposes. The Burmese language is not used.

References

Christianity in Yangon
Karen people
Baptist seminaries and theological colleges in Myanmar